Hidan may refer to:

 The Hidan of Maukbeiangjow, a film
 Hidan (Naruto), a fictional character in the anime and manga series Naruto
 Hidan, Iran, a village in Sistan and Baluchestan Province